Johann Friedrich Thilo Irmisch (14 January 1816 in Sondershausen – 28 April 1879 in Sondershausen) was a 19th-century German botanist.

Irmisch studied theology, philosophy and natural history at the University of Halle-Wittenberg. He received training in botany from professor D. von Schlechtendal, who later became his friend. From 1855, he taught at the high school in Sondershausen. At the same time, he published numerous larger and smaller papers and books on botanical subjects, in particular plant morphology, e.g. Beiträge zur vergleichenden Morphologie der Pflanzen (Contribution to a comparative morphology of plants), published in six volumes 1854-1878.

Two plant genera were named to his honour. His friend and former teacher von Schlechtendal named the genus Irmischia, which was soon synonymized with Metastelma (Apocynaceae). August Eichler then named the genus Thiloa (Combretaceae) for Thilo Irmisch.

Works
 Über einige Botaniker des 16. Jahrhunderts, welche sich um die Erforschung der Flora Thüringens, des Harzes und der angrenzenden Gegenden verdient gemacht haben . Eupel, Sondershausen 1862 Digital edition by the University and State Library Düsseldorf

Literature

References

External links
 
 

1816 births
1879 deaths
People from Sondershausen
19th-century German botanists
Martin Luther University of Halle-Wittenberg alumni